The New Orleans Buccaneers were a charter member of the American Basketball Association.  After three seasons in New Orleans, Louisiana the franchise moved to Memphis, Tennessee, where it became the Pros, Tams and Sounds for four years before an abortive move to Baltimore in 1975.

Origins
With the founding of the ABA on February 2, 1967 a charter franchise was awarded to a group of seven investors, including Morton Downey, Jr. The group obtained their franchise for $1,000 as opposed to the $30,000 fronted by most other original teams. Charles G. Smither, one of the seven owners, served as team president; another of the investors, Maurice M. Stern, was operations manager. The team was named the New Orleans Buccaneers and former Mississippi State University head coach Babe McCarthy was signed as its first coach. Among the team's first players were Doug Moe, Larry Brown, Gerald Govan, Jimmy Jones and Red Robbins.

1967–1968 season
The Buccaneers played their home games at the Loyola University Fieldhouse during their first season and averaged 2,337 fans per game there. Doug Moe, Red Robbins, Larry Brown and Jimmy Jones played in the ABA All Star game and Babe McCarthy coaches the West team in the game. Larry Brown was the Most Valuable Player of the inaugural ABA All Star game and led the ABA in assists that season en route to being named Second Team All ABA.  Doug Moe was named First Team All ABA and Jimmy Jones made the ABA All Rookie Team. The Buccaneers recruited Jackie Moreland, originally from Minden, who had played for the Detroit Pistons from 1960–1965.

The Buccaneers finished the season in first place in the Western Division with 48 wins and 30 losses, putting them two games ahead of the Dallas Chaparrals and three games ahead of the Denver Rockets. The Buccaneers then defeated the Denver Rockets 3 games to 2 in the Western Division semifinals and then defeated the Dallas Chaparrals 4 games to 1 to win the Western Division championship. The Buccaneers then advanced to the first ever ABA Championship series, facing the Pittsburgh Pipers. The Buccaneers and Pipers split the first six games but the Pipers won the decisive seventh game 122-113 to win the 1968 ABA championship.

1968–1969 season
Prior to the season the Buccaneers traded away Larry Brown and Doug Moe to the Oakland Oaks in exchange for Steve Jones and Ron Franz.  New Orleans' Red Robbins and Steve Jones played in the ABA All Star Game.  The Buccaneers finished the season with a record of 46 wins and 32 losses which put them in second place in the Western Division, 14 games behind the Oakland Oaks who had posted a remarkable 60-18 (.769) record. The Buccaneers drew an average of 2,834 fans per home game.

The Buccaneers met the Dallas Chaparrals in the Western Division semifinals and prevailed in a close series, 4 games to 3. Advancing to the Western Division finals, the Buccaneers fell to the Oakland Oaks 4 games to none.

1969–1970 season
The Buccaneers moved their home games to Tulane Gym (now known as Devlin Fieldhouse) and the Municipal Auditorium for the season. Jimmy Jones suffered a knee injury in December that limited his action for the season; he was still selected to play in the ABA All Star game along with teammates Steve Jones and Gerald Govan. Babe McCarthy again coached the West team.

The Bucs finished at .500 with 42 wins and 42 losses. This placed the team in fifth (last) place in that season's highly competitive Western Division, keeping the Buccaneers out of the playoffs.  (In the Eastern Division that season that record would have tied them for third place and put them in the playoffs.)  For the season, New Orleans averaged 2,599 fans per home game.

End of tenure in New Orleans

The team picked up Wendell Ladner in the draft and rechristened itself the Louisiana Buccaneers, planning to play its home games throughout the state during the 1970–1971 season including in New Orleans, Shreveport, Lafayette, Monroe and Baton Rouge.  Like most ABA teams, the Bucs were never on strong financial ground, and the move to the smaller Tulane Gym combined with the marked dropoff in their play caused revenue to dry up.  It was hoped that becoming a "regional" franchise would provide more capital.

However, on August 21, 1970 the franchise was purchased by a new owner and ten days later it was moved to Memphis, Tennessee and renamed the Memphis Pros.

The Buccaneers nickname was picked up by a new NFL expansion team in 1976. Since 2002, the Tampa Bay Buccaneers and New Orleans Saints have competed against each other in the NFC South division.

On December 10, 2008, in a game against the now Charlotte Hornets, the Buccaneers were for the first time "revived" by the New Orleans Pelicans, the city's current NBA franchise, who played the game in 1967–68 styled Bucs throwback jerseys. The team's cheerleading squad was also dressed in Bucs throwback outfits, Bucs video highlights were played throughout the game, and many of the team's past players and coaches were honored at halftime. The Pelicans would win the game 105-89. The Pelicans wore their Buccaneers throwback jerseys once again in a road game against the Cleveland Cavaliers on January 16, 2009, with Cleveland coming out on top 92-78.

Basketball Hall of Famers

Notes:
 1 Inducted as a coach.

Season-by-season

|-
|colspan="6" align=center style="background:#ED1C24; color:#FFFFFF; text-align:center; border:2px solid #000080;"| New Orleans Buccaneers
|-
|1967–68 || 48 || 30 || .615 || Won Division SemifinalsWon Division FinalsLost ABA Finals|| New Orleans 3, Denver 2New Orleans 4, Dallas 1Pittsburgh 4, New Orleans 3
|-
|1968–69 || 46 || 32 || .590 || Won Division SemifinalsLost Division Finals ||  New Orleans 4, Dallas 3Oakland 4, New Orleans 0
|-
|1969–70 || 42 || 42 || .500 || colspan=2|Did not qualify
|-

Notes
The Buccaneers' road uniform was featured in NBA Live 07 as a hidden jersey.

Notes and references

External links
 Remember the ABA New Orleans Buccaneers page
 Remember the ABA franchise page
 Remember the ABA New Orleans Buccaneers owners and rosters page

 
American Basketball Association teams
Defunct basketball teams in the United States
Basketball teams established in 1967
1967 establishments in Louisiana
1970 disestablishments in Louisiana
Basketball teams disestablished in 1970
Basketball teams in New Orleans